This page lists the municipal flags of Shikoku, Japan. It is a part of the List of Japanese municipal flags, which is split into regions due to its size.

Complete lists of Japanese municipal flags pages

 List of municipal flags of Hokkaidō
 List of municipal flags of Tōhoku region
 List of municipal flags of Kantō region
 List of municipal flags of Chūbu region
 List of municipal flags of Kansai region
 List of municipal flags of Chūgoku region
 List of municipal flags of Shikoku
 List of municipal flags of Kyūshū

Tokushima Prefecture

Cities

Towns and villages

Historical

Kagawa Prefecture

Cities

Towns and villages

Ehime Prefecture

Cities

Towns and villages

Kōchi Prefecture

Cities

Towns and villages

Municipal